Wincenty Rzymowski (19 July 1883, in Kuczbork-Osada – 30 April 1950, in Warsaw) was a Polish politician and writer. Rzymowski was one of the many faces of Stalinism in postwar Poland.

Background
In the Second Polish Republic, Wincenty Rzymowski was a member of the Democratic Party and a known publicist. He was also forced to resign his membership in the Polish Academy of Literature in a controversy involving allegations of plagiarism.

During World War II he began collaborating with the Soviets. He joined the Union of Polish Patriots, was a Minister of Arts and Culture in the Polish Committee of National Liberation and a Minister of Foreign Affairs in the Provisional Government of National Unity, formed by Stalin. He represented Poland during the signing of the United Nations Charter.

Wincenty Rzymowski was also a deputy to the State National Council and Legislative Sejm. From 1947 till the end of his life he was a minister without portfolio in the Polish communist government.

References

External links
 

1883 births
1950 deaths
People from Żuromin County
Alliance of Democrats (Poland) politicians
Ministers of Foreign Affairs of Poland
Government ministers of Poland
Members of the State National Council
Members of the Polish Sejm 1947–1952
Diplomats of the Polish People's Republic
Controversies in Poland
Members of the Polish Academy of Literature
People involved in plagiarism controversies
Commanders with Star of the Order of Polonia Restituta
Officers of the Order of Polonia Restituta
Recipients of the Order of the Banner of Work
Recipients of the Gold Cross of Merit (Poland)
Burials at Powązki Cemetery